Jayson Lloyd Gillham (born 1986) is a British-Australian classical pianist, based in London. In 2014, Gillham was the winner of the 2014 Montreal International Musical Competition, which brought him to international attention. His outstanding performance of Beethoven's Piano Concerto No. 4 was described in the Huffington Post as being played 'with such streamlined patrician elegance that he took home First Prize and a string of engagements...' The renowned British conductor Sir Mark Elder said Gillham 'plays Beethoven with a sort of ‘glow’'. In May 2015, Gillham signed a three-album deal with ABC Classics.

Early life
Jayson Gillham was born in Dalby, Queensland. He started piano lessons at the age of four. He had his first public performance at the Dalby Eisteddfod where he played a minuet by J. S. Bach. In 1993, he commenced formal piano lessons from Eugene Gienger in Toowoomba. At the age of seven, he won the Dalby Eisteddfod's Open age section. Later when he was 14, he travelled  each week to Brisbane for piano lessons with Leah Horwitz. At age 17 he was a semi-finalist in the Sydney International Piano Competition.

In 2007, he graduated from the Queensland Conservatorium of Music. Subsequently, he relocated to London in 2007 to study at the Royal Academy of Music, studying with Christopher Elton and winning the Sterndale Bennett Prize. Gillham graduated with a Master's Degree in music. Gillham was supported in his studies by the Tait Memorial Trust, and the Australian Music Foundation.

Career

In 2012 Gillham was Commonwealth Musician of the Year and Gold Medalist of the Royal Over-Seas League 60th Annual Music Competition. Other competition successes include the Leeds International Piano Competition, the Van Cliburn International Piano Competition, and the International Chopin Piano Competition.

Concerto engagements with international orchestras include the London Philharmonic Orchestra, Halle Orchestra, Nashville Symphony, English Chamber Orchestra at the Royal Festival Hall, Melbourne Symphony Orchestra, Sydney Symphony Orchestra, Adelaide Symphony Orchestra, Queensland Symphony Orchestra, Auckland Philharmonia Orchestra, Montreal Symphony Orchestra, and the Wuhan Philharmonic.

In recital, Gillham performs at some of the world's most prestigious venues including the Wigmore Hall, Sydney Opera House, Auditorium du Louvre, Montreal Pollack Hall, Melbourne Recital Centre, City Recital Hall, Queensland Performing Arts Centre and Royal Festival Hall.

His festival highlights include the Verbier Festival, Edinburgh Fringe, Brighton Festival, Linari Classic Festival (Tuscany), Two Moors Festival, Norfolk and Norwich Festival, Deia International Music Festival (Majorca), and Bangalow and Tyalgum Music Festivals (in New South Wales). Gillham has also collaborated with the Carducci, Jerusalem, Brentano, Ruysdael and Flinders string quartets. 

In May 2015, Jayson signed a three-album exclusive recording contract with ABC Classics. His debut recital album featuring works of Bach, Schubert, and Chopin was released in October 2016  and immediately reached the number of one in both the Core Classical and Classical Crossover ARIA charts. This first release was soon followed by his highly acclaimed live recording of Beethoven's Piano Concerto No. 4 with the Sydney Symphony Orchestra under the baton of Vladimir Ashkenazy. Gillham performed the Beethoven Concerto No. 3 with the Adelaide Symphony Orchestra conducted by Sir Jeffrey Tate. His most recent CD, recorded in 2017 of works by Medtner and Rachmaninoff with the Melbourne Symphony Orchestra under Benjamin Northey, received unanimous praise and was Recording of the Month in Limelight magazine. Medtner's Piano Concerto No. 1, as included in this release, will also feature in a documentary film about the life of the renowned Australian pianist Geoffrey Tozer.

In May 2018, Jayson made his debut with the Bournemouth Symphony Orchestra conducted by Victor Aviat. He also joined the Royal Philharmonic Orchestra on a UK tour with the British conductor Alexander Shelley. At the 2020 ARIA Music Awards, Gillham with Adelaide Symphony Orchestra and Nicholas Carter were nominated for Best Classical Album for Beethoven Piano Concertos.

Discography

Albums

Awards

AIR Awards
The Australian Independent Record Awards (known colloquially as the AIR Awards) is an annual awards night to recognise, promote and celebrate the success of Australia's Independent Music sector.

! 
|-
| 2021
| Beethoven: The Piano Concertos 
| Best Independent Classical Album or EP
| 
| 
|}

ARIA Music Awards
The ARIA Music Awards is an annual awards ceremony that recognises excellence, innovation, and achievement across all genres of Australian music. They commenced in 1987. 

! 
|-
| 2017
| Medtner: Piano Concerto No 1 / Rachmaninoff: Piano Concerto No 2 (with Melbourne Symphony Orchestra & Benjamin Northey)
|rowspan="2" | Best Classical Album
| 
|rowspan="2" |
|-
| 2021
| Beethoven Piano Concertos (with Adelaide Symphony Orchestra & Nicholas Carter)
| 
|-

Personal life 
Gillham lives in London with his partner, Sid Mohandas.  Gillham actively supports the LGBTI community and expressed his strong support in favour for the 'Yes' campaign in Australia's Marriage Equality Postal Survey. In an interview with the Dalby Herald, Gillham said, 'It's a significant survey because it shows that Australians are on the whole socially liberal, hopeful and forward-looking'.

References

External links

1986 births
Living people
Australian classical pianists
Male classical pianists
Queensland Conservatorium Griffith University alumni
Musicians from Brisbane
Alumni of the Royal Academy of Music
21st-century classical pianists
21st-century Australian male musicians
21st-century Australian musicians